Agni Air Pvt. Ltd. (Nepali: अग्नि एयर प्रा. ली.) was an airline based in Kathmandu, operating domestic services within Nepal. It started operations in March 2006. The airline ceased operations in November 2012.

History
Agni Air, named after the sanskrit word, commenced operations on 16 March 2006 by connecting Kathmandu to Lukla and Tumlingtar using a single Dornier 228 and started flying to Biratnagar the next day. The Civil Aviation Authority of Nepal granted Agni Air an air operators certificate, allowing it to operate scheduled flights, as well as mountain flights.

The airline's corporate design including the slogan fly the friendly sky was developed by Christian Kracht and Eckhart Nickel after an invitation of tender in 2005. They claim to have never received the 500 Euro royalty.

In 2013, following two accidents and financial difficulties, the airline was taken over by Namaste Air, a Nepalese start-up carrier, which itself never started operations. Upon Agni Air's closure, the remaining aircraft were leased out to Simrik Airlines.

Destinations

Agni Air regularly served the following destinations, which were cancelled either at the closure of operations or before:

Fleet
At the time of closure, Agni Air operated the following aircraft:

Accidents and incidents
On 24 August 2010, Agni Air Flight 101, a Dornier 228, crashed after the crew decided to return and to divert to Simara Airport (VNSI/SIF) due to poor weather conditions at Kathmandu. News reports indicate that the airplane suffered a generator failure and ATC contact was lost around 7:30 am LT. 14 including 6 foreigners killed.
On 14 May 2012, an Agni Air Dornier 228 en route to Jomsom airport (VNJS/JMO), crashed 125 miles from its original location in Kathmandu, killing 15 of the 21 people on board.

Notes

References

External links

  via Wayback Machine

Defunct airlines of Nepal
Airlines established in 2006
2006 establishments in Nepal
2013 disestablishments in Nepal